Pentanema hirtum is a species of perennial herbaceous plant belonging to the family Asteraceae. The specific Latin name hirtum refers to the type of hairiness (bristly and rough) of the plant.

Description
The stem is ascending, simple (unbranched) and cylindrical, the surface is striped and hairy. These plants are covered with stiff hairs, almost bristly and light in color. The underground portion consists of a moderate sized oblique rhizome of a light color. Average size of the rhizome: width , length .

All the leaves along the stem (cauline) are alternately arranged, irregularly toothed, erect, tomentose on both sides and hairy on the edge. They are usually laminar, leathery and rough. The base is rounded and the apex is obtuse. Lower leaves have an elliptical or elliptical-lanceolate shape and have a thin petiole. Their size is more or less similar to the cauline one. Upper leaves are sessile, amplexicaul (their base is embracing the stem) and more lanceolate.

The flowers are hermaphrodite The outer flowers are ligulate, bright yellow and feminine, while the inner ones are tubular, dark yellow and bisexual. The flowering period extends from May through late September. The fruits are glabrous achenes with hairy appendages (pappus).

Distribution
This plant is distributed on Alps, Vosges, Jura Mountains, Pyrenees, Carpathian Mountains, Dinaric Alps, and Balkan Mountains. In the European plains this plant is widespread in southern France and through the Balkan Peninsula to the Caucasus and southern Russia.

Habitat
This species prefers dry meadows and pastures of hills and mountains.

References

Pignatti S. – Flora d'Italia (3 vol.) – Edagricole – 1982. vol. III, p. 45

External links

Biolib
Inula hirta distribution

hirtum
Flora of Europe
Flora of the Pyrenees
Flora of the Alps
Plants described in 1753
Taxa named by Carl Linnaeus